Turbe giovanili is the first solo studio album by Italian rapper Fabri Fibra. It was released in February 2002 by Teste Mobili Records, and produced by fellow rapper Neffa, except for the song "Ma che persona", produced by DJ Lato. Turbe giovanili is an intimate and dark album, focused on suburbs-related themese and on young people's uncertainty about the future, but it also features love songs, as well as some provocative, controversial and misogynist lyrics.

Reprinted multiple times over the following years, the album first charted on the Italian Albums Chart in May 2010, following the release—under Universal Music—of a new version of the record, remastered by Fabri Fibra and Marco Zangirolami. In 2019, it received a gold certification by the Federation of the Italian Music Industry, for domestic sales exceeding 25,000 equivalent album units since 2009.

Track listing

Charts

Certifications

References

2002 debut albums
Fabri Fibra albums